This is a list of broadcast television stations that are licensed in the U.S. state of New Mexico. This list does not include all of the state's many television translators and low-power transmitters.

Many Albuquerque-based or Santa Febased network affiliates have satellite stations in other cities. New Mexico, excluding Doña Ana County, makes up most of the Albuquerque-Santa Fe broadcast market.

Full-power stations
VC refers to the station's PSIP virtual channel. RF refers to the station's physical RF channel.

Defunct full-power stations
Channel 2: KKTO-TV  Ind.  Santa Fe/Albuquerque (10/31/1983-09/07/1992)
Channel 3: KOFT  satellite of KOAT-TV   Farmington (2002-11/2007)
Channel 6: KOCT  satellite of KOAT-TV  Carlsbad (08/24/1956-07/18/2012)
Channel 6: KOBG-TV  satellite of KOB  Silver City (2000-04/26/2011)
Channel 10: KOVT  satellite of KOAT-TV  Silver City (09/1987-07/18/2012)
Channel 14: KGSW-TV  Ind./Fox  Albuquerque (05/08/1981-04/05/1993)

LPTV stations

Translators

See also
 List of Spanish-language television networks in the United States

New Mexico

Television stations